Jiùchéng (旧城, old city) may refer to the following locations in China:

Towns 
 Jiucheng, Anhui, in Lixin County
 Jiucheng, Guangxi, in Pingguo County
 Jiucheng, Guizhou, in Daozhen Gelao and Miao Autonomous County
 Jiucheng, Huanghua, Hebei, in Huanghua
 Jiucheng, Xinji, Hebei
 Jiucheng, Shandong, in Juancheng County
 Jiucheng, Honghe, in Luxi County, Yunnan
 Jiucheng, Weixin County, Yunnan
 Jiucheng, Yingjiang County, Yunnan

Townships 
 Jiucheng Township, Hebei, in Qianxi County
 Jiucheng Township, Yunnan, in Shidian County